Sir Patrick Dun (January 1642 — 24 May 1714) was an Irish physician, and president of the Royal College of Physicians of Ireland.

Life
He was born in Aberdeen, Scotland, the son of Charles Dun and his wife Catherine Burnet and the nephew of Patrick Dun Principal of Marischal College in Aberdeen.

He appeared in 1676 in Dublin as  "physician to the state and my lord-lieutenant" (according to Sir John Hill, quoted in Culloden Papers, London, 1865), and was elected one of the fourteen fellows of the Dublin College of Physicians in 1677. From 1681 to 1687 he was president of the college, and again in 1690–3, in 1696, 1698, and 1706.
He was elected in 1692 to the Irish House of Commons for Killyleagh and sat there until 1695. He was then elected for Mullingar, and held that seat until 1713. Dun accompanied King William III to the Battle of the Boyne.

Dun was evidently a physician in Dublin and had great social influence. He was the friend and medical adviser of Archbishop King (1650–1729), and of many other influential people.

Legacy
On his death in 1713, Dun left his personal library to the college.

In 1815 Sir Patrick Dun's Hospital was founded and named in his honour, by the College of Physicians, noted physicians William Stokes and of Robert James Graves served in the hospital. The hospital was closed in 1986. In 1998 it became the venue for civil marriage ceremonies.

References

External links
 

1642 births
1713 deaths
People of the Williamite War in Ireland
Irish MPs 1692–1693
Members of the Parliament of Ireland (pre-1801) for County Down constituencies
Irish MPs 1695–1699
Irish MPs 1703–1713
Members of the Parliament of Ireland (pre-1801) for County Westmeath constituencies
Presidents of the Royal College of Physicians of Ireland